Optimo may refer to:

Optimo Espacio, night club in Glasgow, Scotland
Optimo (EP), a 1983 EP by post-punk band Liquid Liquid
Optimo cigars, made by Swisher International Group
Deo optimo maximo, Latin phrase meaning "to the greatest and best God"
De optimo senatore, Latin treatise by Wawrzyniec Goślicki published in 1568
Caetano Optimo, minibus manufactured by Salvador Caetano